The 2019-20 Northern Michigan Wildcats men's ice hockey season was the 44th season of play for the program and the 20th in the WCHA conference. The Wildcats represented Northern Michigan University and were coached by Grant Potulny, in his 3rd season.

Roster

As of September 9, 2019.

Standings

Schedule and Results

|-
!colspan=12 style=";" | Exhibition

|-
!colspan=12 style=";" | Regular Season

|-
!colspan=12 style=";" | 

|- align="center" bgcolor="#e0e0e0"
|colspan=12|Northern Michigan Lost Series 0–2

Scoring Statistics

Goaltending statistics

Rankings

References

Northern Michigan Wildcats men's ice hockey seasons
Northern Michigan Wildcats
Northern Michigan Wildcats
Northern Michigan Wildcats
Northern Michigan Wildcats